Tabatinga is a municipality in the state of São Paulo in Brazil. The population is 16,644 (2020 est.) in an area of 369 km². The elevation is 490 m.

References

Municipalities in São Paulo (state)